Sapheneutis camerata is a bagworm species in the genus Sapheneutis. It is found in Sri Lanka.

This species has a wingspan of 12-15mm for the males and 21-23mm for the females.
The forewings are pale-whitish ochreous, markings rather dark fuscous edged with black, a fascia near base and before middle.

References

External links 

Psychidae
Moths described in 1907